"I'll Be True to You" is a song written by Alan Rhody, and recorded by American country music group The Oak Ridge Boys.  It was released in April 1978 as the third single from the album Y'all Come Back Saloon.  The song was The Oak Ridge Boys' third single to hit the country chart and the first of seventeen number one country hits.  The single stayed at number one for one week and spent a total of eleven weeks on the country chart.

Chart performance

References

1978 singles
1978 songs
The Oak Ridge Boys songs
Song recordings produced by Ron Chancey
Dot Records singles